Franziska Brandmann (born 28 April 1994 in Münster) is a German politician and member of the Free Democratic Party (FDP). She has been the federal chairwoman of the FDP-affiliated youth organization Young Liberals (Junge Liberale) since 2021.

Education
Brandmann studied political science at the University of Bonn and European politics at the University of Oxford. Currently, Brandmann is pursuing a PhD and teaching at Oxford on the relationship between contestable democracy and far-right parties.

Political career
Brandmann was elected at the federal congress of the Young Liberals on November 13, 2021, in Erlangen with 182 of 197 votes cast (92.4%) as the federal chairwoman of the Young Liberals. The previous chairman, Jens Teutrine, had not stood for re-election, having been elected to the Bundestag.

Positions 
Franziska Brandmann advocates for market economy and civil liberties. She calls for a "BAföG" reform to support students with financial difficulties, for lower taxes for medium and low incomes, as well as for enhanced support for Ukraine. Also, she argued for a reform of public broadcasting in Germany: The broadcasters should concentrate only on education and information, instead on entertainment and sports. She opposes mandatory quotas for women, a general speed limit at German Autobahnen, civil conscription, and further raising the minimum wage.

References

1994 births
Living people
Free Democratic Party (Germany) politicians
21st-century German women politicians
University of Bonn alumni
Alumni of the University of Oxford
People from Münster